
Eliakim was the son of Hilkiah, succeeded Shebna to become prime minister for King Hezekiah of Judah according to the Hebrew Bible.

References in the Hebrew Bible 

 Book of Kings 2 Kings 18:18, 18:26, 18:37 and 19:2
 Book of Isaiah 22:20, 36:3, 36:11, 36:22 and 37:2

In Christianity
In the Book of Judith, which is considered scripture to the Roman Catholic, Eastern Orthodox and other Christian churches, the book is traditionally said to have been written by Eliachim, the high priest of Jerusalem. According to George Leo Haydock's notes in his study version of the Douay-Rheims Bible, Eliachim is the same person as Eliakim, son of Hilkiah. The original Douay-Rheims Bible claims that the events of the Book of Judith occur during the reign of Manasseh, the king after Hezekiah, so this would fit with the time period that Eliakim was alive.

Archaeology 
In 2019, archaeologist Yosef Garfinkel claimed to have discovered a reference to Eliakim, son of Hilkiah, in two bullae unearthed at Tel Lachish. He described the seal legends as reading "Eliakim, (son of) Yehozarah". 

Found in 1974, an unprovenanced 8th century B. C. bulla, allegedly coming from the Hebron district, was acquired on the antiquities market by the Israel Museum for its Hebrew seals section, and its legend reads "(Belonging to) Yehozarah, son of Hilqi[ya]hu, servant of Hizqiyahu". Garfinkel suggests that the biblical reference of Eliakim as "son" of Hilkiah may be more precisely understood in the sense of descendance, as sometimes happens in other biblical passages.

References

8th-century BCE Hebrew people
Finance ministers
Kingdom of Judah
Books of Kings people
Book of Isaiah people
Gospel of Luke

ca:Eliaquim